Hiển Khánh Vương ( "Prince Hiển Khánh") was the father of Lý Thái Tổ. Very little is known about him, as not much was recorded about him historically; even his real name remains unknown.

Biography
The paternal lineage of Lý Thái Tổ was not prominently recorded in Vietnamese official history. Little was known about his father other than that he was of Fujian extraction. According to Dream Pool Essays by Shen Kuo, Lý Thái Tổ was "a man of Fujian extraction".

According to Vietnamese legend, Lý Thái Tổ had no biological father. His mother, Phạm Thị, dreamed of copulating with a Taoist immortal. Phạm became pregnant and later gave birth to Lý Thái Tổ at Cổ Pháp Pagoda. At the age of 3, Phạm brought him back to the pagoda. Lý Khánh Văn (李慶文), head monk of the pagoda, adopted him and named him Lý Công Uẩn.

After Lý Công Uẩn became emperor, he granted his father the title Hiển Khánh vương (顯慶王) posthumously.

Modern research
Chinese-Vietnamese historian Li Taishan (李泰山) discovered a record in the genealogy of the Li clan of Anhai which showed that the father of Lý Công Uẩn was Li Chun'an (Vietnamese: Lý Thuần An, 9 October 921 – 29 November 999). Historical sources disagree on whether Li Chun'an's wife Phạm Thị Ngà gave birth to Lý Công Uẩn in Fujian or Jiaozhi.

Li Chun'an was said to be the first of two sons of Li Song. After Li Song was falsely accused and executed in 948 during the Later Han dynasty, Li Chun'an escaped to Quanzhou which was then controlled by the warlord Liu Congxiao (but nominally under the control of the Southern Tang dynasty).

He resettled in the Li Family village in Anhai, Quanzhou and became a Water mid Land Transport Commissioner (水陸轉運使) at some point. Some time later, he deserted his official post to escape from an unspecified danger, and traveled by South China Sea to Jiaozhi (now Vietnam), Champa and Khmer Empire for business, spending the most time in Jiaozhi. He fathered several children, including Lý Công Uẩn who would later become the founding emperor of the Lý dynasty.

Family
 Consort : Phạm Thị (Empress Dowager Minh Đức)
 Issues : Vũ Uy Vương, Lý Công Uẩn, Dực Thánh Vương
 Relatives : Lý Khuê, Vạn Hạnh, Lý Khánh Văn

See also
 Lý Thái Tổ
 Vạn Hạnh

References

Unidentified people
10th-century Vietnamese people
11th-century Vietnamese people
People from Bắc Ninh province
Lý dynasty princes